Blaupunkt GmbH was a German manufacturer of mostly car audio equipment. It was owned by Robert Bosch GmbH from 1933 until 1 March 2009, when it was sold to Aurelius AG of Germany. It filed for bankruptcy in late 2015 with liquidation proceedings completed in early 2016. The brand is now managed by GIP Development SARL of Luxembourg and is used on various product groups worldwide.

History 
Founded in 1924 in Berlin as "Ideal," the company was acquired by Robert Bosch AG in 1933. In 1938 it changed its name to "Blaupunkt", German for "blue point" or "blue dot", after the blue dot painted onto its headphones that had passed quality control.

After World War II, Blaupunkt moved its headquarters and production to Hildesheim.

Blaupunkt took over a former Philips/Grundig factory in Portugal to produce automotive head units. It is still owned and operated by Bosch, used exclusively to make OEM units for car manufacturers and 24V (e.g., Coach) AV equipment. Later, factories were set up in Tunisia (speakers) and Malaysia (speakers and electronics).

In 1949, Blaupunkt advertised the first FM-capable car radio. By the 1960 and 1970s, Blaupunkt had become one of the leading German manufacturers of car radios and car audio equipment. In 1983, it began selling an in-dash CD player.

After the 2011 take-over, Blaupunkt became a managed brand name, with all production outsourced to China.

Products
Blaupunkt was involved in developing the Autofahrer-Rundfunk-Informationssystem traffic-information system for car radios and provided this feature on their German-market car radios from the late 1970s.  The company attempted to have ARI used in the United States but had only a few radio stations per major city involved.

For many years, Blaupunkt car audio equipment models often carried the name of a city somewhere in the world, e.g., "London RDM126".  In Blaupunkt model terminology, this can be translated as "An RDS CD player capable of controlling a Multichanger, rated at 4×30 W RMS (4 × 30 = 120) from the model year 1996".  High-end models typically had German place names.

Blaupunkt also used the brand "Velocity" to sell products aimed at the top, audiophile end of the market. Audi, Volkswagen, Porsche, Mercedes, Proton, Vauxhall, Pontiac, Holden and BMW all fit Blaupunkt (now simply Bosch) products into their cars, often branded with the car manufacturer's mark (e.g., The VW Gamma, Audi Symphony or BMW Business CD lines), with Fiat using them, occasionally unbranded but generally unmodified. Some later Holden Astra models are fitted with Blaupunkt systems (with others being produced by Delphi Automotive). Blaupunkt also specialised in coach installations, selling TVs, multiple-speaker setups, and PA equipment to that industry. That part of the business has remained with Robert Bosch Car Multimedia GmbH, a 100% subsidiary of Robert Bosch GmbH. The Blaupunkt branding is no longer used, even on 'hidden' stickers.

Rockford Fosgate alliance
On 12 July 2012, Blaupunkt signed an agreement with Rockford Fosgate granting the Rockford Corporation exclusive distribution rights for the company's car multimedia and headphones range for the North American market. Rockford Fosgate sold Blaupunkt products, including car radios, navigation, amplifiers, loudspeakers, rear seat entertainment, connectivity, and electronics for the OEM market through distributors.

Gallery

References

Sources
 Blaupunkt company profile
 Bosch BLAUPUNKT HISTORY
 TV 1950
 Radio 1963
 Radio 1938

External links
 Blaupunkt

German brands
Audio equipment manufacturers of Germany
Loudspeaker manufacturers
In-car entertainment
Robert Bosch GmbH
Economy of Hildesheim
Companies based in Lower Saxony
Electronics companies established in 1923
1923 establishments in Germany
Radio manufacturers